The 2017 Canadian U18 Curling Championships were held from April 18 to 22 at the Superior Propane Centre and Curl Moncton in Moncton, New Brunswick.

Men

Round-robin standings

Final round-robin standings

Championship Pool Standings

Final Championship Pool Standings

Playoffs

Semifinals
Sunday, April 22, 1:00 pm

Bronze medal game
Sunday, April 22, 5:15 pm

Final
Sunday, April 22, 5:15 pm

Women

Round-robin standings

Final round-robin standings

Championship Pool Standings

Final Championship Pool Standings

Playoffs

Semifinals
Sunday, April 22, 1:00 pm

Bronze medal game
Sunday, April 22, 5:15 pm

Final
Sunday, April 22, 5:15 pm

References

External links

U18 Championships
Canadian U18 Curling Championships, 2017
2017 in New Brunswick
April 2017 sports events in Canada